Lamar "Buddy" Allen (November 25, 1914 – May 16, 1989) was an American football player, coach, and baseball center fielder in the Negro leagues. He served as the head football coach at Arkansas Agricultural, Mechanical & Normal College (Arkansas AM&N)—now known as University of Arkansas at Pine Bluff—for four seasons, from to 1946 to 1949, compiling a record of 17–19–5.

Allen played as a back for Pine Bluff Merrill High School, a segregated black school in Arkansas, which won national championships in 1932, his freshman year, and 1933. His accomplishments were such that even the state's white newspapers, including the Arkansas Gazette took notice. He played baseball with the Birmingham Black Barons in 1940.

Head coaching record

References

External links
 and Baseball-Reference Black Baseball Stats and  Seamheads 
 Buddy Allen at Arkansas Baseball Encyclopedia

1914 births
1989 deaths
American football quarterbacks
Arkansas–Pine Bluff Golden Lions football coaches
Arkansas–Pine Bluff Golden Lions football players
Sportspeople from Pine Bluff, Arkansas
African-American coaches of American football
African-American players of American football
Merrill High School alumni
Birmingham Black Barons players
Baseball players from Arkansas
Baseball outfielders
People from Ashley County, Arkansas
20th-century African-American sportspeople